John Moulder Wilson (October 8, 1837 – February 1, 1919) was a Union Army officer and later served as Chief of Engineers as well as serving as Superintendent of the United States Military Academy from 1889–1893. He was a recipient of the Medal of Honor for bravery in combat during the American Civil War.

Biography
Wilson was born in Washington, D.C. He graduated from the United States Military Academy in 1860 and was commissioned into combined Batteries B & L, 2nd U.S. Artillery as part of the U.S. Horse Artillery Brigade. He transferred to the Corps of Topographical Engineers in July 1862 and was awarded the Medal of Honor for fighting at the Battle of Malvern Hill in Virginia, on August 6, 1862. He joined the United States Army Corps of Engineers in 1863 and received three brevet promotions for gallant service in Alabama.

After the Civil War, Wilson worked on Hudson River improvements and drafted plans for the canal around the Cascades of the Columbia River. He improved the Great Lakes harbors of Oswego, New York, Cleveland, Ohio, and Toledo, Ohio. Wilson headed the divisions of the Chief's office pertaining to military affairs for four years, was in charge of public buildings and grounds in Washington during both Grover Cleveland administrations, and was Superintendent of West Point from 1889-1893 during the administration of President Benjamin Harrison.   Before his appointment as Chief of Engineers, he was Northeast Division Engineer.   He was appointed as Chief Engineer of the US Army and promoted to brigadier general on February 1, 1897.  As Chief of Engineers, he directed the Corps' activities during the Spanish–American War.

Wilson retired from the Corps on April 30, 1901. He served as an arbitrator during the Coal Strike of 1902, and was president of the Columbia Hospital for Women from 1902 to 1907. He remained a prominent figure in the cultural life of Washington until his death there on February 1, 1919.

General Wilson was a Companion of the Military Order of the Loyal Legion of the United States. He also received an honorary Doctor of Laws degree from Columbia University.

Medal of Honor citation
Rank and organization: First Lieutenant, U.S. Engineers. Place and date: At Malvern Hill, Va., August 6, 1862. Entered service at: Washington Territory. Birth: Washington D.C.. Date of issue: July 3, 1897.

Citation:

Remained on duty, while suffering from an acute illness and very weak, and participated in the action of that date. A few days previous he had been transferred to a staff corps, but preferred to remain until the close of the campaign, taking part in several actions.

Personal
Wilson was the son of Joseph Shields Wilson and his first wife Eliza Uhler Moulder. His older sister Mary Shields Wilson was the wife of Brevet Brig. Gen. Thomas Duncan. His older brother Brevet Brig. Gen. Thomas Wilson was a 1853 West Point graduate and his younger brother Lt. Commander Downs Lorraine Wilson was an 1871 Naval Academy graduate.

Wilson married Augusta Bertha Waller. They had a daughter, but she died about six months old in New Orleans. Wilson and his wife were buried at the West Point Cemetery.

See also

 List of American Civil War Medal of Honor recipients: T–Z

References
This article contains public domain text from

External links
 Men of Mark in America Biographical Sketch
 

1837 births
1919 deaths
People from Washington, D.C.
United States Military Academy alumni
Union Army officers
United States Army Medal of Honor recipients
American Civil War recipients of the Medal of Honor
Superintendents of the United States Military Academy
United States Army generals
United States Army Corps of Engineers Chiefs of Engineers
Burials at West Point Cemetery